Samir Ahmed Ayass (born 24 December 1990) is a professional footballer who plays as a midfielder.

Coming through the youth system, Ayass began his senior career in 2008 at hometown club CSKA Sofia, before moving to cross-city side Akademik Sofia in 2010. He then went on to play for various Bulgarian sides, namely Minyor Pernik, Bansko, Montana, Lyubimets, and Beroe Stara Zagora, before returning to CSKA Sofia in 2015, winning the Bulgarian Cup. The following year he joined Dunav Ruse, before moving to Lebanon in 2017 to Ahed. After having won multiple titles, including the 2019 AFC Cup, Ayass returned to Dunav Ruse in 2019, before moving to Persiraja in Indonesia the following year. He moved back to Bulgaria in 2021, at Botev Vratsa, and then joined Malaysian side Perak.

Born in Bulgaria, Ayass represented them at youth level before switching allegiance to Lebanon, for whom he made his senior international debut in 2017. He helped his team reach the 2019 AFC Asian Cup for the first time through qualification, playing in the final tournament.

Early life
Samir Ayass was born in Sofia, Bulgaria to a Lebanese father and a Bulgarian mother. He started his playing career at CSKA Sofia at the age of six.

Club career

Dunav Ruse 
On 6 October 2016, Ayass signed a one-and-a-half-year contract with Dunav Ruse. He scored his first goal for the team on 9 April 2017, in a 1–0 win over champions Ludogorets Razgrad.

Ahed 
On 4 August 2017, Ayass signed a two year contract with Lebanese Premier League champions Ahed for an undisclosed fee. He returned to Dunav Ruse in Bulgaria on 11 July 2019.

Persiraja 
On 17 February 2020, Ayass moved to newly promoted Indonesian Liga 1 side Persiraja. Following the cancellation of the 2020 season due to the COVID-19 pandemic, Ayass was released. He re-joined in March 2021 on trial ahead of the 2021 season.

Botev Vratsa 
On 3 April 2021, Ayass returned to Bulgaria, joining Botev Vratsa for the final part of the 2020–21 First Professional League. He made his debut on 8 April, coming on as a substitute and winning a penalty for his team; they lost 2–1 to Botev Plovdiv. Ayass helped Botev avoid relegation.

Perak 
On 19 June 2021, Ayass moved to Perak in the Malaysia Super League. He left the club at the end of September after his contract expired.

International career

Bulgaria 
Ayass played for the Bulgarian under-21 team between 2011 and 2012, and was capped three times. However, he was never called-up for the senior team.

Lebanon 
Eligible to represent Lebanon through his father, on 20 March 2017 he accepted the call up for Lebanon for the match against Hong Kong on 28 March 2017, for the 2019 AFC Asian Cup qualification. He completed his debut, coming as a substitute on the 69th minute.

On 10 October 2017, Ayass scored his first international goal for Lebanon against North Korea, in a 5–0 home win at the Asian Cup qualifications. In December 2018, he was called up for the 2019 AFC Asian Cup squad, featuring in two group stage games.

Style of play
Ayass is a technical midfielder with good attacking capabilities.

Career statistics

Club

International

Scores and results list Lebanon's goal tally first, score column indicates score after each Ayass goal.

Honours
CSKA Sofia
 Bulgarian Cup: 2015–16

Ahed
 AFC Cup: 2019
 Lebanese Premier League: 2017–18, 2018–19
 Lebanese FA Cup: 2017–18, 2018–19
 Lebanese Super Cup: 2017, 2018

See also
 List of Lebanon international footballers born outside Lebanon

References

External links

 
 
 
 
 

1990 births
Living people
Footballers from Sofia
Lebanese footballers
Bulgarian footballers
Lebanese people of Bulgarian descent
Bulgarian people of Lebanese descent
Sportspeople of Lebanese descent
Association football midfielders
PFC CSKA Sofia players
Akademik Sofia players
PFC Minyor Pernik players
FC Bansko players
FC Montana players
FC Lyubimets players
PFC Beroe Stara Zagora players
FC Dunav Ruse players
Al Ahed FC players
Persiraja Banda Aceh players
FC Botev Vratsa players
Perak F.C. players
Second Professional Football League (Bulgaria) players
First Professional Football League (Bulgaria) players
Lebanese Premier League players
Liga 1 (Indonesia) players
Malaysia Super League players
Bulgaria youth international footballers
Lebanon international footballers
2019 AFC Asian Cup players
Lebanese expatriate footballers
Bulgarian expatriate footballers
Expatriate footballers in Indonesia
Expatriate footballers in Malaysia
Lebanese expatriate sportspeople in Indonesia
Lebanese expatriate sportspeople in Malaysia
Bulgarian expatriate sportspeople in Indonesia
Bulgarian expatriate sportspeople in Malaysia
Bulgaria under-21 international footballers